The Wright Crusader was a single-decker bus body built on Dennis Dart SLF, Volvo B6LE and Volvo B6BLE chassis by Wrightbus between 1995 and 2002.

First generation (1995–2000)
The Wright Crusader was introduced in 1995, replacing the Wright Handybus. Early Crusaders have tall, square-cornered or gasket side windows and a shallow roofline, similar to their predecessor. Most had a double-curvature windscreen.

Following the construction of one prototype and a demonstrator, the first production batch of Crusaders, on B6LE chassis, were delivered to Mainline in October 1995. The first Dennis Dart SLF Crusaders were delivered to London United in September 1996.

Of the 425 first generation Crusaders produced, 154 were on Dennis Dart SLF chassis and 272 on Volvo B6LE chassis. Travel West Midlands purchased 149 B6LEs, subsidiary Travel Merry Hill took a further 23. GM Buses North purchased 46, while Australian operator ACTION purchased 25 Darts.

Second generation (1999–2002)
The second generation Crusader, known as the Crusader 2, was introduced in 1999 on Volvo B6BLE chassis, the successor to the B6LE. In contrast to early first generation Crusaders, all Crusader 2s have shallower windows with a deeper panel above, bringing them in line with other Wrightbus designs like the Endurance and Pathfinder; some of the later built first generation Crusaders shared this characteristic however, making the two designs indistinguishable except for the different chassis. It retained its double-curvature windscreen.

The first Crusaders 2s were delivered to Mainline in April 1999; the delivery included one rebodied B6LE with prototype Crusader 2 bodywork, as well as nine newly built Crusader 2s. Of the 267 Crusader 2s produced, FirstGroup purchased 86, Arriva 61 and Dublin Bus 52.

Gallery

References

 Millar, Alan (2007) Bus & Coach Recognition : Ian Allan Ltd.,

External links

Low-floor buses
Midibuses
Vehicles introduced in 1995
Crusader